Count of Lavradio is a Portuguese title of nobility created twice.

The first creation was by King Pedro II of Portugal, by Letters Patent of 16 March 1670, for Luís de Mendonça Furtado e Albuquerque, 1st and only Count of Lavradio. Luís de Mendonça Furtado was a nobleman, distantly related to both the Portuguese and Spanish reigning families, a soldier and statesman, with a distinguished career in India where he was nominated one of the triumvirate of interim governors in 1661 and later, in 1670, as the 54th Governor and 31st Viceroy of India. He did not marry and died, childless, while returning to Portugal in 1677. It was through his influence that Lavradio, his birthplace on the left bank of the Tagus River, was raised to the category of a town. 

The second creation was conferred in perpetuity by King João V of Portugal for D. António de Almeida Soares de Portugal, together with the Seigniory of Lavradio, on 12 January 1714, registered in the Registo Geral de Mercês on 4 June 1725, and confirmed by Letters Patent. The Count was later created 1st Marquess of Lavradio, and the title of Count of Lavradio has been used as a subsidiary title of the House of Lavradio on four more occasions by younger sons and close relatives of the head of the family with the latter's permission.

Background
See: Marquessate of Lavradio - Background

Origins and Family History
See: Marquessate of Lavradio - Origins and Family History

Counts of Lavradio (1725)

 D. António de Almeida Soares de Portugal (1701—1760), 1st Marquess and 1st Count of Lavradio, 4th Count of Avintes, 8th Viceroy of Brasil.
 D. Francisco de Almeida Portugal (1787—1870), 2nd Count of Lavradio, Peer of the Realm and Minister of State of Portugal. Younger brother of the 4th and 5th Marquesses of Lavradio.
 D. Salvador de Almeida Corrêa de Sá (1854—1903), 1st Baron of Paulo Cordeiro by marriage. Second grandson of the 5th Marquess of Lavradio and younger brother to the heir of the House of Lavradio.
 D. António de Almeida Corrêa de Sá (1879—1965), younger brother of the 6th Marquess of Lavradio.
 D. António de Almeida Corrêa de Sá (1941), 5th Count of Figueiró. Grandson, respectively, of the 4th Count of Lavradio and 6th Marquess of Lavradio.

Coat of Arms 
The Counts of Lavradio use the same arms as those of the Counts of Avintes.

See also 
 Marquesses of Lavradio
 Counts of Avintes
 Counts of Torres Vedras

Footnotes

References

External links 
Genealogy of the Marquesses of Lavradio
Portuguese noble titles
Countships of Portugal
Portuguese nobility
Portuguese noble families
1710s establishments in Portugal
1714 establishments in Europe
History of Portugal